The EcoCentro Expositor Querétaro is an exposition center located in El Marqués, Quéretaro, near Santiago de Querétaro. Ecocentro was opened in 2001 by then president Vicente Fox. Currently the Querétaro fair is held every year in November, and the El Marqués fair is held in May.

Features
Ecocentro has an arena, a racetrack including an oval and a karting track.

Track

Inaugurated on March 30, 2008 is located in the Ecocentro. The oval was opened in October 2009.

The oval has paper clip shape with a flat turn 1-2 (common between the two tracks) and a banked turn 3-4. Also, there is a  dragstrip where 1/8 mile events are held regularly.

The track has hosted the NASCAR Corona Series, the Copa Pirelli, the LATAM Challenge Series, the Super Copa Telcel, and CARreras.

Nascar PEAK Mexico Series

Waldemar Coronas became the first foreign driver to win at this circuit in this category.

Events

 Current

 March: Campeonato Mexicano de Súper Turismos Ida y Vuelta, NACAM Formula 4 Championship
 May: NASCAR Mexico Series, NACAM Formula 4 Championship, NASCAR Mikel's Truck Series
 June: Gran Turismo Mexico
 August: NASCAR Mexico Series, NASCAR Mikel's Truck Series
 September: Campeonato Mexicano de Súper Turismos ¡Gran Premio Viva México!, NACAM Formula 4 Championship

 Former

 Fórmula Panam (2013, 2015–2016, 2018)
 LATAM Challenge Series (2008–2011, 2013)

Lap records

The official race lap records at the EcoCentro Expositor Querétaro are listed as:

References

External links
EcoCentro Expositor Querétaro race results at Racing-Reference

Motorsport venues in Mexico
NASCAR tracks
Sports venues in Querétaro